Grace Bowman may refer to:

 Grace Bowman (equestrian) (born 1990), Australian Paralympic equestrian
 Grace Bowman (Secret Life of the American Teenager), a character on Secret Life of the American Teenager
 Grace Bowman (Colony), fictional character in Colony